Balaji may refer to

Religion 
 Venkateswara, one of the incarnations of Vishnu
 Balaji Mandir (disambiguation), a list of temples

Organisations 
 Balaji Wafers, a FMCG group based in Rajkot, Gujarat
 Balaji Institute of Modern Management Pune, a business school in Pune, India
 Balaji Motion Pictures, a film production house in Mumbai, India
 Balaji Telefilms, a film production house in Mumbai, India

People 
 Balaji, an Indian name (for persons with the name see )
 K. Balaji (1934-2009), South Indian producer and actor
 Balaji K. Kumar, American/Indian film director
 Balaji Srinivasan, American entrepreneur, investor, and futurist

Other uses 
 Balaji (leopard), a leopard in the Sri Venkateswara Zoological Park
 Balaji, Iran, a village in West Azerbaijan Province, Iran

Indian surnames